Christian Kauter (born 6 May 1947) is a Swiss fencer. He won a silver medal in the team épée event at the 1972 Summer Olympics and a bronze in the same event at the 1976 Summer Olympics.

His sons Fabian Kauter and Michael Kauter have also fenced in the Olympics, both in épée.

References

External links
 

1947 births
Living people
Swiss male épée fencers
Olympic fencers of Switzerland
Fencers at the 1968 Summer Olympics
Fencers at the 1972 Summer Olympics
Fencers at the 1976 Summer Olympics
Olympic silver medalists for Switzerland
Olympic bronze medalists for Switzerland
Olympic medalists in fencing
Sportspeople from Bern
Medalists at the 1972 Summer Olympics
Medalists at the 1976 Summer Olympics
20th-century Swiss people
21st-century Swiss people